KRZQ (105.9 FM, "Ace Country 105.9") is a radio station in Amargosa Valley, Nevada serving the area with a country music format.

References

External links

RZQ
Radio stations established in 2011
2011 establishments in Nevada
Country radio stations in the United States